is a district located in Fukuoka Prefecture, Japan.

As of 2003 statistics and counting the decrease in size and population due to the Kurume merger, the district has an estimated population of 14,305 and a density of 776 persons per km2. The total area is 18.43 km2.

Towns and villages 
Ōki

Mergers 
On February 5, 2005 the former towns of Jōjima and Mizuma merged with two towns (from other districts) into the expanded city of Kurume.

Districts in Fukuoka Prefecture